The Kenya women's cricket team toured Botswana in December 2019 to play a seven-match Women's Twenty20 International (WT20I) series. The venue for all of the matches was the Botswana Cricket Association Oval in Gaborone. Originally the tour was scheduled to be a tri-series, however Namibia withdrew prior to the series. The bilateral series was won 4–1 by Kenya, with two games abandoned due to rain.

Squads

WT20I series

1st WT20I

2nd WT20I

3rd WT20I

4th WT20I

5th WT20I

6th WT20I

7th WT20I

References

External links
 Series home at ESPN Cricinfo

Cricket in Botswana
Women's cricket in Kenya
Associate international cricket competitions in 2019–20
2019 in Kenyan cricket
2020 in Kenyan cricket